Karatepe (Turkish, 'Black Hill') is a Hittite fortress in Osmaniye Province in Turkey.

Karatepe may also refer to:

Places in Turkey
 Karatepe, Alaca
 Karatepe, Antalya
 Karatepe, Bismil
 Karatepe, Gazipaşa
 Karatepe, Kalecik
 Karatepe, Köşk
 Karatepe, Merzifon

Other uses
 Kara Tepe refugee camp, in Lesbos, Greece
 Kara Tepe, a Buddhist archaeological site in Termez, Uzbekistan

See also
 
 Qarah Tappeh (disambiguation), often rendered as Kara Tepe
 Karatepe bilingual, an 8th-century BC inscription on stone slabs